Khatra Adibasi Mahavidyalaya is the general degree college in Khatra in Bankura district in the Indian state of West Bengal. It offers undergraduate courses in arts and commerce and sciences. It is affiliated to  Bankura University.

History
This college was established in 1979 by Govt. of West Bengal.

Departments

Arts, Commerce and Science
Bengali (honors & pass)
English (honors & pass)
Sanskrit (honors & pass)
Santhali (honors & pass)
History (honors & pass)
Commerce(accountancy honors) & pass
Science(math honors & pass), Chemistry & physics honors, physical education(pass), Philosophy (honors), music (pass), Geography (pass)

Accreditation
Khatra Adibasi Mahavidyalaya  is accredited and was awarded a B+ grade by the National Assessment and Accreditation Council (NAAC). The college is recognized by the University Grants Commission (UGC). This college organized three National seminars. It has one strong N.C.C. group and three powerful N.S.S. units.

See also

References

External links 
 Khatra Adibasi Mahavidyalaya

Colleges affiliated to Bankura University
Educational institutions established in 1979
Universities and colleges in Bankura district
1979 establishments in West Bengal